16th Street Park, also known as Dominico – 16th Street Park, is a municipal park in Bayonne, New Jersey. It is located on the west side of the city along the Newark Bay across from Port Newark–Elizabeth Marine Terminal. It is a component of the Hackensack RiverWalk.

History
The park was developed as a Works Progress Administration project.

The park is named in dedication to G. Thomas DiDomenico, who was mayor of Bayonne from 1955–1959.

In 2022, a memorial bench to honor Jersey City Police detective Joseph A. Seals who lost his life in connection to the 2019 Jersey City shooting, was created.

Facilities
An amphitheatre, the  municipal pool (1997), a firing range, and a boat launch can be found at the park. There are courts for handball, tennis, basketball, volleyball and pickleball as well as fields for baseball, softball, and soccer. Walking paths include the Hackensack RiverWalk.

See also 
Collins Park (Bayonne, New Jersey)
Hudson County Park System

References 

Bayonne, New Jersey
Urban public parks
Parks in Hudson County, New Jersey
Works Progress Administration in New Jersey